Tom Abdo (April 12, 1894 – March 1967) was a poker player inducted into the Poker Hall of Fame in 1982.  He died after suffering a heart attack while playing. According to a poker legend, after suffering the heart attack, he asked another player to count his chips and to save his seat, intending to return to the game.

Notes

American poker players
1894 births
1967 deaths
Poker Hall of Fame inductees